The Junior Vagliano Trophy is an annual girls amateur golf tournament. It is co-organised by The R&A and the European Golf Association and is contested by teams representing "Great Britain and Ireland" and the "Continent of Europe". The first event was in 2011. Originally it was played in odd-numbered years at the same time and location as the Vagliano Trophy but in 2021 it became an annual event. Girls must be under-16 on 1 January of the year of the event. The Continent of Europe has won all seven matches to date.

Format
The competition involves various match play matches between players selected from the two teams of 6, either singles and foursomes. The winner of each match scores a point for their team, with half a point each for any match that is tied after 18 holes. If the entire match is tied, the previously winning team retains the Trophy.

A foursomes match is a competition between two teams of two golfers. The golfers on the same team take alternate shots throughout the match, with the same ball. Each hole is won by the team that completes the hole in the fewest shots. A fourball match is a competition between two teams of two golfers. All four golfers play their own ball throughout the round. Each hole is won by the team whose individual golfer had the lowest score. A singles match is a standard match play competition between two golfers.

The contest is played over two days, with three foursomes and six singles matches on each day, a total of 18 points.

Results

Future sites 
2023 - Royal Dornoch

Teams

Great Britain and Ireland
2022:  Grace Crawford,  Marina Joyce Moreno,  Rosie Bee Kim,  Isla McDonald-O'Brien,  Amelia Wan,  Maggie Whitehead
2021:  Grace Crawford,  Rosie Bee Kim,  Harriet Lockley,  Katie Poots,  Maggie Whitehead,  Ellen Yates
2019:  Beth Coulter,  Hannah Darling,  Carmen Griffiths,  Darcey Harry,  Patience Rhodes,  Ffion Tynan
2017:  Sarah Byrne,  Caitlin Whitehead,  Lily May Humphreys,  Euphemie Rhodes,  Ffion Tynan,  Carys Worby
2015:  Hazel MacGarvie,  Mairead Martin,  Shannon McWilliam,  Hollie Muse,  Emily Price,  Annabel Wilson
2013:  Samantha Fuller,  Alice Hewson,  Sophie Lamb,  Fiona Liddell,  Sophie Madden,  Olivia Mehaffey
2011:  Georgia Hall,  Charley Hull,  Bronte Law,  Amber Ratcliffe,  Clara Young,  Chloe Williams

Continent of Europe
2022:  Johanna Axelsen,  Anna Cañadó Espinal,  Carla De Troia,  Andrea Revuelta Goicoech,  Perla Sól Sigurbrandsdóttir,  Lynn van der Sluijs
2021:  Helen Briem,  Cayetana Fernández García-Poggio,  Francesca Fiorellini,  Constance Fouillet,  Meja Örtengren,  Nora Sundberg
2019:  Pia Babnik,  Francesca Fiorellini,  Nataliya Guseva,  Amalie Leth-Nissen,  Carolina López-Chacarra,  Lucie Malchirand
2017:  Caterina Don,  Blanca Fernández García-Poggio,  Isabella Holpfer,  Amanda Linnér,  Alessia Nobilio,  Emilie Alba Paltrinieri
2015:  Mathilde Claisse,  Julia Engström,  Isabella Holpfer,  Frida Kinhult,  Agathe Laisné,  Emma Spitz
2013:  Mathilda Cappeliez,  Eva Gilly,  Csicsi Rózsa,  Alejandra Pasarin,  Covadonga Sanjuan,  Albane Valenzuela
2011:  Shannon Aubert,  Clara Baena,  Quirine Eijkenboom,  Karolin Lampert,  Harang Lee,  Emily Kristine Pedersen

See also
Vagliano Trophy
Jacques Léglise Trophy

References

External links
 Coverage on the R&A's site
 Coverage on the EGA's site

Junior golf tournaments
Team golf tournaments
European international sports competitions
R&A championships